Lúcio Silva de Souza (born 3 July 1988), known simply as Silva, stylized as "SILVA", is a Brazilian singer, songwriter, and multi-instrumentalist.

Career
Silva released his first album "Claridão" on the Som Livre label in 2012. In 2014 he released "Vista pro mar," followed by "Júpiter" in 2015, "Silva canta Marisa" in 2016, and "Brasileiro" in 2018. Silva has toured Brazil for each of his five albums and collaborated with Anitta, Fernanda Takai, Marisa Monte, Ivete Sangalo, Lulu Santos, and Ludmilla.

Discography
  (2012)
  (2014)
  (2015)
  (2016)
  (2018)
  (2020)

Recognition
Rolling Stone Brasil named the album "Vista pro mar" as No. 8 in its list of the best Brazilian albums of 2014 and in 2018 "Brasileiro" was ranked No. 22. The latter was also elected among the 25 best Brazilian albums of the first half of 2018 by the São Paulo Association of Art Critics.

Personal life
Silva is openly gay and was in a relationship with Fernando Sotele from 2016 to 2019.

References

External links

Brazilian male singer-songwriters
Música Popular Brasileira singers
People from Vitória, Espírito Santo
Living people
1988 births
21st-century Brazilian male singers
Brazilian LGBT singers
Brazilian LGBT songwriters
Brazilian gay musicians
Gay singers
Gay songwriters
LGBT people in Latin music